Clare Range is the range extending west-southwest from Sperm Bluff to the Willett Range on the south side of Mackay Glacier, in Victoria Land. It was circumnavigated in 1957 by the New Zealand Northern Survey Party of the Commonwealth Trans-Antarctic Expedition (1956–58), and named by them after Clare College, Cambridge, England.

References
 

Mountain ranges of Victoria Land
Scott Coast